Oscar Wong Tse Yang (born 13 May 1995) is a Hong Kong professional footballer who plays as a goalkeeper for Harini.

Career

Wong started his career with Hong Kong side Glory Sky, where he made five league appearances.

Before the 2019 season, Wong signed for Melaka United in the Malaysian top flight.

He joined Malaysia M3 League team Harini for the 2022 season.

Personal life
He is the son of former Malaysia international Wong Kam Fook.

References

External links
 
 Wong Tse Yang at playmakerstats.com

1995 births
Living people
Hong Kong footballers
Malaysian footballers
Hong Kong people of Malaysian descent
Association football goalkeepers
Hong Kong Premier League players
Malaysia Premier League players
Melaka United F.C. players
Citizens of Malaysia through descent